The Last Shot is a 2004 comedy film

The Last Shot may also refer to:

 The Last Shot (1951 film), a 1951 West German drama film
 The Last Shot (basketball), Michael Jordan's game-winning shot in Game 6 of the 1998 NBA Finals
 Last Shot: A Final Four Mystery, a young adult novel by John Feinstein
 Last Shot (Gregg Hurwitz novel), a novel by Gregg Hurwitz
 Nothing Underneath, a 1985 giallo film also known as The Last Shot
 Last shot, in contract law
 "Last Shot", a song by Kip Moore